Gregers Krabbe (12 January 1594 – 20 December 1655) was a Danish nobleman  who served as Governor-general of Norway.

Biography
He was born in on the Vesløsgård estate at Hannæs in  northwestern Jutland, Denmark. He was a son of Niels Krabbe til Vesløsgård (d. 1626) and Vibeke Ulfstand (1559–1611). He was a brother-in-law of Niels Trolle and Niels Krabbe. From the age of 14 to the age of 23, he stayed abroad, partly as an educational trip  with studies in Germany, France and Italy.

From 1617 to 1625 he was secretary  in the Danish Chancellery. From 1627 he was lord over the Danish county of  Hindsgavl in Odense and from 1639 to 1651 at  Riberhus. He was a member of the national council from 1640, and held several diplomatic missions from 1640-1643.
He served as Governor-general of Norway from 1651, and died at the Akershus Castle in Christiania (now Oslo) in 1655. He was succeeded as governor  by his brother-in-law Niels Trolle.

References

1594 births
1655 deaths
17th-century Danish nobility
Governors-general of Norway